Calder Park Raceway is a motor racing circuit in Melbourne, Victoria, Australia. The complex includes a dragstrip, a road circuit with several possible configurations, and the "Thunderdome", a high-speed banked oval equipped to race either clockwise (for right-hand-drive cars) or anti-clockwise (for left-hand-drive cars such as NASCAR).

History

Calder Park Raceway was founded in the farming community of Diggers Rest and began as a dirt track carved into a paddock by a group of motoring enthusiasts who wanted somewhere to race their FJ Holdens. One of those men was Patrick Hawthorn, who at the time owned a petrol station in Clayton, when one of his clients suggested a place to race, on his property.

The inaugural meeting on a bitumen track was run by the Australian Motor Sports Club and took place on 14 January 1962. The track design was very similar to the existing Club Circuit, which is still in use today. Competitors at this meeting included former Calder Park owner Bob Jane (Autoland Jaguar 3.8 #84), Norm Beechey (Holden #40), John Wood (Holden #83) and Peter Manton (Mini Cooper).

In the early 1970s, champion racer and Melbourne tyre retailer Bob Jane purchased the track. The circuit not only hosted road racing but also drag racing while the infield formed part of the Rallycross track. Lengthening the straight also gave the drag strip a longer runoff and slow down area.

In 1982 the circuit was renamed to the Melbourne International Raceway, while for the round of the 1985 Australian Touring Car Championship, series broadcaster Channel 7 referred to Calder as the Keilor International Raceway.

Thunderdome
The Thunderdome is a purpose-built  quad-oval speedway located on the grounds of Calder Park Raceway. It was originally known as the Goodyear Thunderdome to reflect the naming rights sponsorship bought by the Goodyear Tire & Rubber Company.

With its "double dogleg" front stretch and the start/finish line located on a straight section rather than the apex of a curve, the Thunderdome is technically a quad-oval in shape, though since its opening it has generally been referred to as a tri-oval. The track, modelled on a scaled down version of the famous Charlotte Motor Speedway, has 24° banking on Turns 1, 2, 3 and 4 while the front stretch is banked at 4° and the back straight at 6°.

The Thunderdome was completed in 1987, but can trace its roots back over twenty years previously when Australian motorsport icon Bob Jane, previous owner of Calder Park Raceway, travelled to the United States and visited the Charlotte Motor Speedway and Daytona International Speedway numerous times to gauge stock car racing's rise in popularity. With NASCAR getting more air time on Australian television largely thanks to the influence of Channel 7 motorsport commentator and Sydney speedway promoter Mike Raymond, in 1981 Jane struck a deal with Bill France Jr., the head of NASCAR, to bring stock car racing to Australia and plans were laid out for a high banked oval adjacent to the existing Calder Park Raceway.

Ground first broke for the track in 1983 and it took four years to complete. It was built at a cost of A$54 million— with Jane personally contributing over $20 million of his own money. Due to the lack of such knowledge in Australia, during construction Jane was forced to bring in engineers from the USA who had experience in building high banked speedway ovals. The Thunderdome was officially opened by the Mayor of the Keilor City Council on 3 August 1987.

The first race on the Thunderdome was held just two weeks after its opening, although the track used incorporated both the Thunderdome and the pre-existing National Circuit. It was a 300-kilometre event for Group A touring cars, with John Bowe and Terry Shiel in a turbocharged Nissan Skyline DR30 RS taking first place – to date the only time a Japanese car has won a race held on the Thunderdome.

AUSCAR had the distinction of hosting the first ever race to exclusively use the Thunderdome. The race, aptly named the AUSCAR 200, was held a week prior to the Goodyear NASCAR 500. In a shock to the male dominated establishment, 18-year-old female driver Terri Sawyer won the 110 lap race driving a Holden VK Commodore. Sawyer had qualified her Commodore on the front row of the grid and ran at or near the front all day to win from Kim Jane (the nephew of Calder owner Bob Jane), Max de Jersey, Phil Brock and Graham Smith. The top five positions all went to those driving either a VK or VL Commodore.

The first NASCAR race that used only the oval was the Goodyear NASCAR 500 held on 28 February 1988 (unlike the "500s" in US NASCAR racing, the Australian version was only 500 km, or 310 mi - roughly the same distance as a Busch Series race). The race was nationally televised by the Seven Network and was shown in the USA on ESPN. It featured some of Australia's top touring car and speedway drivers as well as a slew of imports from the Winston Cup, including Bobby Allison (who had won his third Daytona 500 just two weeks earlier in a thrilling finish from his son Davey, giving the Thunderdome race a big publicity boost), Neil Bonnett (who had won the Winston Cup race at the Richmond International Raceway the previous weekend), Michael Waltrip, Harry Gant, Morgan Shepherd, Dave Marcis, Rick Wilson and others. NASCAR's most famous last name was also represented with 1987 Coca-Cola 600 winner Kyle Petty making the trip down under.

In a test session prior to the 1988 Goodyear NASCAR 500, NASCAR's "King" Richard Petty, the record holder for the most victories in NASCAR history with 200 career wins and the father of Kyle Petty, set an unofficial lap record for the Thunderdome of 28.2 seconds for an average speed of 142.85 mp/h. This was some 6/10ths of a second faster than Bonnett's pole time for the race.

Bonnett won the race in a Pontiac Grand Prix from Allison in a Buick LeSabre and Marcis in a Chevrolet Monte Carlo. The race saw a heavy crash on lap 80 which took some 6 cars out of the race including Australian's Dick Johnson (Ford Thunderbird) and Allan Grice (Oldmobile Delta 88) who suffered a broken collar bone after hitting Johnson's already crashed car at high speed in the middle of turns 3 and 4. Grice, who like Johnson had a Racecam unit in his car and in a NASCAR first was able to talk to the Channel 7 commentary team while racing, had been unable to slow sufficiently due to his car's lack of brakes which he had told the television audience about only laps before the crash.

This was the first time a NASCAR event had been staged outside North America and it proved so popular that many of the same drivers returned for another race held at the Thunderdome that December, the Christmas 500, with three-time Indianapolis 500 winner Johnny Rutherford returning to Australia for the first time since his brief appearance in the 1977 Bathurst 1000 to be part of the driving line up. Morgan Shepherd would go on to win the race with a four-second margin over Sterling Marlin, the only two competitors in the event to finish on the lead lap.

The Thunderdome also played host to numerous Australian Stock Car Auto Racing (AUSCAR) events until that series ended in 2001. AUSCAR was unique in that the cars were right-hand drive and based on the Australian Ford Falcon and Holden Commodore. Engines were limited to 5.0L which allowed use of the existing Holden V8 engine and the Ford 302 engine, though until Ford Australia re-introduced the 302 V8 to the Falcon range in 1991, those who raced the Ford XF Falcon used the 5.8L 351 Cleveland V8. Unlike NASCAR, the right-hand drive AUSCARs raced clockwise on oval tracks such as the Thunderdome and the  mile Speedway Super Bowl at the Adelaide International Raceway. The most successful AUSCAR driver was Brad Jones who won five straight championships from 1989/90 until 1993/94 in various Commodores. Jones also successfully made the transition to NASCAR, winning the Superspeedway Series on his first try in 1994/95.

Motorsport
Calder Park has hosted events ranging from Australian touring cars, historics, Super Tourers, Super Trucks and Super Bikes to rock concerts featuring world class artists such as Fleetwood Mac, Santana and Guns N' Roses.

Between 1980 and 1984, Calder Park played host to the Australian Grand Prix. The 1980 race was won by Australia's Alan Jones driving the Williams FW07B he drove to win the  Formula One World Championship, the race being open to F1, Formula 5000 and Formula Pacific cars (as of 2022 this is the final time an Australian driver won the AGP). Young Brazilian driver Roberto Moreno dominated the AGP from 1981 to 1984, winning the race in 1981, 1983 and 1984, while finishing third behind F1 aces Alain Prost and Jacques Laffite in 1982. During this period, Calder owner Bob Jane managed to entice many F1 drivers to race in the Grand Prix at Calder including World Champions Jones, Prost, Niki Lauda, Nelson Piquet and Keke Rosberg as well as Laffite, Bruno Giacomelli, Didier Pironi, François Hesnault and Andrea de Cesaris, as well as Australian internationals Geoff Brabham and Larry Perkins. The 1981-1984 races were open to Formula Pacific cars only with both Moreno and Prost winning the races driving 1.6-litre Ford powered Ralt RT4s.

A round of the 1987 World Touring Car Championship was held on the Calder Park Grand Prix circuit on 11 October 1987. This race used the combined road and oval circuits and was won by the Eggenberger Motorsport Ford Sierra RS500 driven by Steve Soper and Pierre Dieudonné.

Also in 1987, the combined road-oval circuit was used for a round of the Swann Series for Superbikes. For safety reasons the bikes were not allowed onto the 24° banked turns in the Thunderdome and they had to use the flat track apron as the turns. The bikes were allowed onto the 4° front straight with witches hats (cones) placed on the track to tell riders where the edge of the track was.

Calder was also the first to host Superbike racing and Truck Racing, the trucks competing on both National and Thunderdome circuits in separate events. The AUSCAR series was developed to race on the Thunderdome.

The National Circuit's long front straight also features a drag strip, which was the home of the Australian National Drag Racing Championship for many years. There are also Legal Off Street Drag Racing every Friday night unless weather is unsuitable for racing.

Drag Racing authority ANDRA national level events were absent for twelve years until 2013 due to a dispute between the governing body and circuit owner Bob Jane.

More recently, Calder Park introduced drifting events to its impressive list of motorsport activities. The first ever Drift Nationals held in March 2004 attracted over 8,000 spectators and added another inaugural event to the long list of new activities nurtured by Calder Park Raceway.

In 2021, Australian National Drag Racing Association announced the establishment of an annual Australian Drag Racing Championship series, with ASID as one of five venues across the country to host a round in the inaugural season.

Guns N' Roses concert 
On 1 February 1993, Guns N' Roses performed at Calder Park as part of the Use Your Illusion Tour. The concert was fraught with controversy, including reports that security staff had prohibited patrons from bringing their own food, drinks and sunscreen into the venue; this most seriously affected a diabetic teenage girl, whose medication and carefully portioned food were confiscated. The weather was very hot on that day, reportedly , and many concertgoers went to the venue on special shuttle buses. The buses left the venue shortly after Guns N' Roses performed their final song, leaving many concertgoers stranded. There are reports that they walked all the way down the Calder Highway back to Melbourne, looting a 7-Eleven on the highway for food. An inquiry into the conditions was held, with the findings published by Ombudsman Victoria in May 1993. To this day, this was the last ever concert to be performed at Calder Park.

Australian Grand Prix
Calder Park held the Australian Grand Prix each year from 1980 until 1984, after which the race became a round of the Formula One World Championship and was held at the Adelaide Street Circuit. In 1980, the race was open to cars from Formula One, Formula 5000 and Formula Pacific. For 1981–1984 the race was restricted to Formula Pacifics.

Touring Car round winners

Calder Park held 25 rounds of the Australian Touring Car Championship between 1969 and 2001. Allan Moffat has won the most ATCC rounds at Calder, winning five times (1970, 1973, 1976, 1977 and 1983).

World Touring Car Championship
On 11 October 1987, Calder Park hosted Round 9 of the inaugural World Touring Car Championship on the combined road course and the newly built high banked Thunderdome. The race, known as the Bob Jane T-Marts 500, was won by England's Steve Soper and Belgian driver/journalist Pierre Dieudonné in a Ruedi Eggenberger built Ford Sierra RS500.

National championship rounds
Rounds of various Australian motor racing championship were held at Calder.

Australian Drivers' Championship

* The Calder round of both the 1982 and 1983 Australian Drivers' Championships were also the Australian Grand Prix. The round win was awarded to the highest placed domestic series driver.

Australian Sports Car Championship

Australian Sports Sedan Championship

Australian GT Championship

Australian Nations Cup Championship

Track information

Thunderdome (Oval circuit): 
National Circuit: Length 
Club Circuit:
Combined Road & Oval Circuit: 

The first 100 metres of the Drag Strip was resurfaced in 2006 due to irregularities in the start line area, the strip reopened for the Legal Off Street Drag Racing event on Friday 17 November 2006.

Layout history

Lap records

The official fastest race lap records at the Calder Park Raceway are listed as:

References

External links
 
 Trackpedia's guide to racing and driving Calder Park

Motorsport venues in Victoria (Australia)
Sports venues in Melbourne
NASCAR tracks
Former Supercars Championship circuits
Drag racing venues in Australasia
Sports venues in Victoria (Australia)
Australian Grand Prix
1962 establishments in Australia
Speedway venues in Australia
World Touring Car Championship circuits
Sport in the City of Brimbank
Buildings and structures in the City of Brimbank